The Tour of Aegean is a cycling race held in Turkey. It is part of UCI Europe Tour in category 2.2.

Winners

References

Cycle races in Turkey
2015 establishments in Turkey
Recurring sporting events established in 2015
UCI Europe Tour races